Scott Harper may refer to:

 Scott Harper (candidate), Democratic candidate for Illinois's 13th congressional district
 Scott Harper (composer), American composer and musician